This is a list of lighthouses in Ghana, which are located along the Atlantic coastline of the country.

Jamestown Lighthouse in Accra
Fort William (Lighthouse) in Cape Coast
Bobwasi Island
Cape St. Paul Lighthouse in Woe
Cape Three Points
Chemu Point
Fort Orange
Takoradi

See also
List of lighthouses in Ivory Coast (to the west)
List of lighthouses in Togo (to the east)
 Lists of lighthouses and lightvessels

References

External links

Ghana
Lighthouse
Lighthouses